Robert G. Syme was a Scottish professional association footballer who played as a centre forward. He played a total of 20 matches in the English Football League and scored two goals.

References

Footballers from Edinburgh
Scottish footballers
Association football forwards
Dunfermline Athletic F.C. players
Manchester City F.C. players
Burnley F.C. players
English Football League players
Year of birth missing
Year of death missing